Cycas sexseminifera is a species of cycad in northern Vietnam and southern China.

Range
It is widespread in:
southern and central Guangxi, China
Cao Bang Province, Vietnam
Thanh Hoa Province, Vietnam

References

sexseminifera